The 2006 Danish Cup Final was the final and deciding match of the Danish Cup 2005-06. It took place on Thursday 11 May 2006 at Parken Stadium in Copenhagen and saw the 1st Division leaders Randers FC beat Superliga club Esbjerg fB after extra time. 

Randers have won the Cup on three previous occasions (1967, 1968 and 1973). As well as 1976, Esbjerg also won the Cup in 1964.

In the Superliga in 2005-06, Esbjerg finished sixth and in Viasat Sport Division is Randers currently leading.

Referee Kim Milton Nielsen officiated the match.

Road to Copenhagen

 Randers started in third round.
 Esbjerg started in fifth round.
 Square brackets [ ] represent the opposition's division.

Match facts

External links
 Match facts at Esbjerg fB
 Match facts at Haslund.info

Danish Cup Finals
Danish Cup Final 2006
Danish Cup Final 2006
Cup
Sports competitions in Copenhagen
May 2006 sports events in Europe
2006 in Copenhagen